HD 96566 is a single star in the southern constellation of Carina. It has the Bayer designation z1 Carinae; HD 96566 is the identifier from the Henry Draper Catalogue. This object has a yellow hue and is visible to the naked eye with an apparent visual magnitude of +4.62. The star is located at a distance of approximately 376 light years from the Sun based on parallax, but is drifting closer with a radial velocity of −1 km/s. It has an absolute magnitude of −0.81.

This is an aging G-type giant star with a stellar classification of G7.5III, which indicates it has exhausted the supply of hydrogen at its core then cooled and expanded off the main sequence. It has an estimated 3.6 times the mass of the Sun and has grown to 20 times the Sun's radius. The metallicity, or abundance of elements other than hydrogen and helium, is about the same as in the Sun. It is radiating about 214 times the Sun's luminosity from its photosphere at an effective temperature of 4,913 K.

References

G-type giants
Carina (constellation)
Carinae, z1
Durchmusterung objects
0412.1
096566
054301
4325